Puticuli were ancient Roman mass graves located outside of cities where the dead bodies of the poor and rubbish were buried. Usually they were left uncovered. It was considered shameful to be buried inside of these graves. One puticuli located in the Esquiline cemetery was divided into two sections, one for artisans, and the other for the poor, prisoners, and other groups. This section was one thousand feet long and three hundred feet deep. It contained one hundred vaults which were thirty feet deep and twelve feet square. They were filled with large quantities of various kinds of bodies. Some were of men or women and children. Others were of animals.

References 

Burial monuments and structures in Italy
Death customs
Cemeteries and tombs in Rome
Mass graves
Ancient Roman culture